The Tale of Tom Kitten is a children's book, written and illustrated by Beatrix Potter. It was released by Frederick Warne & Co. in September 1907. The tale is about manners and how children react to them. Tabitha Twitchit, a cat, invites friends for tea. She washes and dresses her three kittens for the party, but within moments the kittens have soiled and lost their clothes while scampering about the garden. Tabitha is "affronted". She sends the kittens to bed, and tells her friends the kittens have the measles. Once the tea party is underway however, its "dignity and repose" are disturbed by the kittens romping overhead and leaving a bedroom in disorder.

Plot Summary

This book tells the story of three little kittens, Mittens, Tom Kitten and Moppet, who get into mischief. Their mother, Mrs. Tabitha Twitchit, grooms and dresses them up for company she is expecting, then sends them out with the admonishment that they not get dirty. They not only get dirty but lose their clothes to some passing puddle-ducks. When they return, she hides them upstairs and tells her company that they have the measles.

Book connections
Tabitha Twitchit had appeared in a previously published story, The Tale of the Pie and the Patty-Pan, in which she was a shop keeper. The illustrations included her kittens playing.

The cat family re-appeared in The Tale of Samuel Whiskers or, The Roly-Poly Pudding. One of the kittens featured in The Story of Miss Moppet and Tabitha Twitchit and her shop are mentioned again in The Tale of Ginger and Pickles.

One of the puddle-ducks from the story is featured in The Tale of Jemima Puddle-Duck.

Inspirations
The cat family home was based on Beatrix Potter's own house, Hill Top in Cumbria.

Adaptations
An animated adaptation of the story, shown alongside The Tale of Jemima Puddle-Duck, was featured on The World of Peter Rabbit and Friends in 1993.

References
Footnotes

Works cited

External links

The Tale of Tom Kitten at Internet Archive
 

1907 children's books
Books by Beatrix Potter
Books about cats
Picture books by Beatrix Potter
Anthropomorphic cats
Frederick Warne & Co books
British children's books
British picture books